Royal Air Force Llandwrog or, more simply, RAF Llandwrog is a former Royal Air Force station located at Llandwrog, southwest of Caernarfon, Gwynedd, Wales. The site opened in January 1941 as a RAF Bomber Command airfield for training gunners, radio operators and navigators and closed after the end of the Second World War in 1945. It reopened in 1969 and remains in civil operation today as Caernarfon Airport.

History
No. 9 Air Gunnery School was the first tenant of the base when it opened at the end of January 1941. It was equipped with Armstrong Whitworth Whitley bombers and Avro Anson training aircraft. Two days after flying commenced, the airfield was attacked by a single Junkers Ju 88 bomber that strafed the airfield, damaging one Whitley. Airspeed Oxford trainers from No. 11 Service Flying Training School were deployed to Llandwrog in mid-1941 to complete its students' night flying requirements. The following year, three of its Whitleys were deployed to RAF Driffield to participate in the first "Thousand Bomber" raid on Cologne, Germany on the night of 30/31 May 1942, although one aircraft failed to return.

Several weeks later the Air Gunnery School was disbanded and the field became a satellite of No. 9 (Observers) Advanced Flying Unit at RAF Penrhos. The unit conducted its night-flying training at Llandwrog and later moved its headquarters there. It was disbanded on 14 June 1945 and flying activities ended. No. 2 Air Crew Holding Unit then became the tenant. The airfield was reactivated for private aircraft in 1969 in preparation for the Investiture of the Prince of Wales at nearby Caernarfon Castle and it was occasionally used from then on. Eventually, this became frequent enough that the airfield became Caernarfon Airport. The runways and taxiways are still intact, although the original hangars have been demolished.

Units
The following additional units were here at some point:
 No. 31 Maintenance Unit RAF 
 No. 277 Maintenance Unit RAF

Mountain Rescue
Early in 1942, prompted by an increasing number of aircraft accidents in the North Wales mountains, the RAF Llandwrog Mountain Rescue Section was formed on a local, volunteer basis. The initiative came from the medical officer at the base, Flight Lieutenant G. R. Graham. The team at Llandwrog, and other similar teams elsewhere, were officially recognised towards the end of 1943. The Royal Air Force Mountain Rescue Service started operations in May 1943, but due to the administrative lag of wartime, it was not officially promulgated until January 1944.

Chemical weapons storage
Almost 71,000 bombs containing the nerve agent Tabun had been seized in Germany at the end of the war, and these were stored in the open at RAF Llandwrog, until 1954 when, in Operation Sandcastle, they were transported to Cairnryan for disposal aboard scuttled ships at sea, 120 miles (190 km) north-west of Ireland.

Current use
The main site is now Caernarfon Airport. Other parts of the site have been repurposed as workshops and small businesses, whilst many buildings remain largely untouched since the end of the war.

See also
 List of former Royal Air Force stations

Citations

Bibliography

Royal Air Force stations in Wales
Llandwrog